Greenacre may refer to:

Greenacre, New South Wales, suburb of Sydney, Australia
Greenacre (Farmington, Maine), listed on the NRHP in Maine
Greenacre (surname)
Greenacre Academy, a boys' secondary school in Walderslade, Kent, England
Greenacre School for Girls, an independent school in Banstead, Surrey, England
 Greenacre Foundation, created in 1968 by Abby Rockefeller Mauzé to maintain and operate parks in New York State

See also
 Greenacre or Blackacre, the common placeholder name for estates in law
 Greenacres (disambiguation)
 Green Acres (disambiguation)